Rusli Noor (born 1 May 1927) is an Indonesian diplomat who served as the eighth secretary-general of ASEAN between 1989 and 1993. He also served as executive director of the APEC in 1995. and Indonesian Ambassador to Denmark and Norway.

References

1927 births
Indonesian diplomats
Secretaries-General of ASEAN
Possibly living people
Columbia University alumni
Indonesian expatriates in the United States
Indonesian expatriates in Norway
Indonesian expatriates in Denmark